Indonesia competed at the 2016 Summer Olympics in Rio de Janeiro, Brazil, from 5 to 21 August 2016. This was the nation's fifteenth appearance at the Summer Olympics.

The National Sports Committee of Indonesia (KONI) confirmed a team of 28 athletes, 17 men and 11 women, to compete across seven sports at the Games. Three of them obtained their spots to compete in athletics and swimming through wild card entries, with the rest of the team directly qualifying for the Games on merit. Among the sporting events the nation competed in, Indonesia made its Olympic debut in men's team archery and BMX cycling, as well as its return to rowing after 12 years.

The Indonesian roster featured ten returning Olympians, with three of them headed to their third straight Games: badminton shuttler Liliyana Natsir, along with her partner Tontowi Ahmad, in the mixed doubles, and two-time bronze medalists Eko Yuli Irawan and Triyatno in weightlifting. Other notable Indonesian athletes included Beijing 2008 champion Hendra Setiawan in the men's badminton doubles and long jumper and reigning Asian Games champion Maria Natalia Londa, who was appointed as the nation's flag bearer in the opening ceremony.

Indonesia left Rio de Janeiro with three Olympic medals (one gold and two silvers), improving its medal tally from London four years earlier. Among the nation's medalists were badminton players Ahmad and Natsir, who both bounced back from their fourth-place finish in London to secure the mixed doubles gold, and weightlifting rookie Sri Wahyuni Agustiani, who won Indonesia's first medal of the Games with a silver in the women's 48 kg. Meanwhile, Irawan set a historic milestone as the first Indonesian weightlifter to win medals across three Olympic Games, winning a silver in the men's 62 kg to complement his two previous bronze medals.

Medalists

| width="78%" align="left" valign="top" |

| width="22%" align="left" valign="top" |

| width="22%" align="left" valign="top"|

| width="22%" align="left" valign="top" |

Competitors

The following is the list of number of competitors participating in the Games:

Archery
 
One Indonesian archer qualified for the women's individual recurve by obtaining one of the eight Olympic places available from the 2015 World Archery Championships in Copenhagen, Denmark. Three Indonesian archers qualified for the men's events by virtue of the nation's podium finish in the team recurve competition at the 2016 Archery World Cup meet in Antalya, Turkey.

Athletics
 
Indonesian athletes have so far achieved qualifying standards in the following athletics events (up to a maximum of 3 athletes in each event):

Track & road events

Field events

Badminton

Indonesia has qualified a total of ten badminton players for each of the following events into the Olympic tournament based on the BWF World Rankings as of 5 May 2016: two pairs in the mixed doubles, a pair each in the men's and women's doubles, and one entry each in the men's and women's singles.

Men

Women

Mixed

Cycling

BMX
Indonesia has receive an invitation from the UCI to send a men's BMX rider to the Olympics, as the next highest-ranked eligible nation, not yet qualified, in the UCI Olympic Ranking List of May 31, 2016, signifying the nation's Olympic return to the sport for the first time since 2004. Indonesia's top-ranked BMX rider and 2014 Asian Games fourth-place finalist Toni Syarifudin was named to the Olympic roster on June 8, 2016.

Rowing

Indonesia has qualified one boat each in the men's and women's single sculls for the Olympics at the 2016 Asia & Oceania Continental Qualification Regatta in Chungju, South Korea, signifying the nation's Olympic return to the sport for the first time since 2004.

Qualification Legend: FA=Final A (medal); FB=Final B (non-medal); FC=Final C (non-medal); FD=Final D (non-medal); FE=Final E (non-medal); FF=Final F (non-medal); SA/B=Semifinals A/B; SC/D=Semifinals C/D; SE/F=Semifinals E/F; QF=Quarterfinals; R=Repechage

Swimming

Indonesia has received a Universality invitation from FINA to send two swimmers (one male and one female) to the Olympics.

Weightlifting

Indonesian weightlifters have qualified five men's and two women's quota places for the Rio Olympics based on their combined team standing by points at the 2014 and 2015 IWF World Championships. The team must allocate these places to individual athletes by June 20, 2016.

The weightlifting team, headlined by London 2012 medalists Eko Yuli Irawan and Triyatno, was named to the Olympic roster on June 21, 2016.

Men

Women

See also
 2016 Olympic Games
 2016 Paralympic Games
 Indonesia at the Olympics
 Indonesia at the Paralympics
 Indonesia at the 2016 Summer Paralympics

References

External links 

 

Olympics
2016
Nations at the 2016 Summer Olympics